Epimartyria is a genus of small primitive metallic moths in the family Micropterigidae.

Species
Epimartyria auricrinella Walsingham, 1898
Epimartyria bimaculella Davis & Landry, 2012
Epimartyria pardella (Walsingham, 1880)

References

Micropterigidae
Moth genera
Taxa named by Thomas de Grey, 6th Baron Walsingham